Democratic People's Liberation Front−DPLF, a registered political party in Sri Lanka and a front of the People's Liberation Organisation of Tamil Eelam (PLOTE).

History
DPLF was established in 1987. While People's Liberation Organisation of Tamil Eelam was fighting the LTTE and other paramilitary factions in the North, they decided to enter democratic politics and gain power in parliament.
 
Even after their entrance to democratic politics, they would participate in battles such as the 1988 Maldives coup d'etat. PLOTE would enter parliament in 2001.
 
From 2001-2004 DPLF had  D. Siddarthan, elected from Vanni Electoral District.  DPLF lost its parliamentary representation in the 2004 elections.

References

1987 establishments in Sri Lanka

Political parties established in 1987
Political parties in Sri Lanka
Tamil National Alliance
Sri Lankan Tamil nationalist parties
Indian Peace Keeping Force